Himanshu Sangwan (born 2 September 1995) is an Indian cricketer. He made his List A debut on 27 September 2019, for Railways in the 2019–20 Vijay Hazare Trophy. He made his Twenty20 debut on 8 November 2019, for Railways in the 2019–20 Syed Mushtaq Ali Trophy. He made his first-class debut on 9 December 2019, for Railways in the 2019–20 Ranji Trophy.

References

External links
 

1995 births
Living people
Indian cricketers
Railways cricketers
Place of birth missing (living people)